Hatkachora is a census town in Bastar district in the Indian state of Chhattisgarh.

Demographics
 India census, Hatkachora had a population of 6054. Males constitute 51% of the population and females 49%. Hatkachora has an average literacy rate of 64%, higher than the national average of 59.5%: male literacy is 72%, and female literacy is 56%. In Hatkachora, 13% of the population is under 6 years of age.

References

Cities and towns in Bastar district